Mollisiaceae is a family of fungi in the order Helotiales. It contains almost 800 species in 17 genera with multiple genera remaining undescribed. Saprotrophs and root endophytes are prominent in the family but it also includes endophytes of other plant tissues. Due to a lack of accessible morphological features, the family has been difficult to study resulting in limited understanding of its taxonomy. Genetic studies suggest that the family comprises much overlooked biodiversity.

Genera
 Barrenia  (3 species)
 Bulbomollisia  (3 species)
 Cystodendron  (11 species)
 Discocurtisia  (1 species)
 Mollisia  (411 species)
 Neotapesia  (3 species)
 Niptera  (80 species)
 Nipterella  (4 species)
 Phialocephala  (152 species)
 Pseudonaevia  (2 species)
 Pyrenopeziza  (221 species)
 Sarconiptera  (1 species)
 Scutobelonium  (2 species)
 Scutomollisia  (15 species)
 Tapesia  (121 species)
 Trimmatostroma  (42 species)
 Variocladium  (3 species)

References 

Helotiales
Ascomycota families